was the 110th emperor of Japan, according to the traditional order of succession.

Go-Kōmyō's reign spanned the years from 1643 through 1654.

This 17th-century sovereign was named after the 14th-century Nanboku-chō Emperor Kōmyō and go- (後), translates as later, and thus, he could be called the "Later Emperor Kōmyō". The Japanese word go has also been translated to mean the second one, and in some older sources, this emperor may be identified as "Kōmyō, the second", or as Kōmyō II".

Genealogy

He was the fourth son of Emperor Go-Mizunoo.  His mother was Fujiwara no Mitsuko, the daughter of the Minister of the Left (Sadaijin); but he was raised as if he were the son of Tōfuku-mon'in. His predecessor, Empress Meishō, was his elder paternal half-sister.

Go-Kōmyō's Imperial family lived with him in the Dairi of the Heian Palace. His family included only one daughter and no son:

Lady-in-waiting (Naishi-no-Suke) : Niwata Hideko (d. 1685; 庭田秀子), Niwata Shigehide's daughter
First daughter: Imperial Princess Takako (1650–1725; 孝子内親王) later Empress Dowager Reiseimon’in (礼成門院)

Events of Go-Kōmyō's life
Tsuguhito-shinnō was granted the title of Crown Prince; and the following year, he became Emperor when Empress Meishō abdicated.  His sister stepped down from the throne and the succession (senso) was received by the new monarch. Shortly thereafter, Emperor Go-Kōmyō is considered to have acceded to the throne (sokui). The events during his lifetime shed light on his reign. The years of Go-Kōmyō's reign correspond  with a period in which Tokugawa Iemitsu and Tokugawa Ietsuna were leaders at the pinnacle of the Tokugawa shogunate.

 April 20, 1633: The birth of an Imperial prince who will become known by the posthumous name of  Go-Kōmyō-tennō.
 1641 (Kan'ei 19): Prince Tsuguhito was named heir; and he was given the title of Crown Prince.
 1643 (Kan'ei 20, 29th day of the 9th month): The empress ceded her throne to her brother by abdicating; and the succession (senso) was received by his younger brother.
 November 14, 1643 (Kan'ei 20, 3rd day of the 10th month): Go-Kōmyō accepted the title; and he is said to have acceded to the throne (sokui). He was age 11. His reign is considered to have begun.
 1645 (Shōhō 2, 23rd day of the 4th month): The shōgun was elevated to the rank of sadaijin.
 1649 (Keian 2, 20th day of the 2nd month): There was a major earthquake in Edo.
 1651 (Keian 4): Tokugawa Ietsuna was proclaimed shōgun.
 1652 (Keian 5, 5th month): Nihon Ōdai Ichiran is first published in Kyoto under the patronage of the tairō Sakai Tadakatsu, lord of the Obama Domain of Wakasa Province.
 1653 (Jōō 2, 12th day of the 8th month): A violent fire destroyed a large part of the imperial palace and many temples which were nearby.  Shortly thereafter, several girls, aged 12–14 years, were imprisoned for arson involving this fire as well as other fires in Kyoto.
 1654 (Jōō 3, 6th day of the 7th month): Ingen, a Buddhist priest who would eventually become very influential,  arrived at Nagasaki from China.  His intention was to reform the practice of Buddhism in Japan.
 October 30, 1654 (Jōō 3, 20th day of the 9th month): The emperor died.  He was buried at Sennyū-ji on the 15th day of the 10th month. There is a probability that the emperor died of smallpox.

Go-Kōmyō is among those enshrined in the imperial mausoleum, Tsuki no wa no misasagi, at Sennyū-ji in Higashiyama-ku, Kyoto.  Also enshrined are Go-Kōmyō's immediate predecessors, Emperor Go-Mizunoo and Empress Meishō.   Go-Kōmyō's immediate Imperial successors are also memorialized in this misasagi, including Go-Sai, Reigen, Higashiyama, Nakamikado, Sakuramachi, Momozono, Go-Sakuramachi and Go-Momozono.

Kugyō
 is a collective term for the very few most powerful men attached to the court of the Emperor of Japan in pre-Meiji eras. Even during those years in which the court's actual influence outside the palace walls was minimal, the hierarchic organization persisted.

In general, this elite group included only three to four men at a time.  These were hereditary courtiers whose experience and background would have brought them to the pinnacle of a life's career.  During Go-Kōmyō's reign, this apex of the Daijō-kan included:
 Sesshō, Nijō Yasumichi, 1635–1647
 Sesshō, Kujō Michifusa, 1647
 Sesshō, Ichijō Akiyoshi, 1647
 Kampaku, Ichijō Akiyoshi, 1647–1651
 Kampaku, Konoe Hisatsugu, 1651–1653
 Kampaku, Nijō Mitsuhira, 1653–1663
 Sadaijin
 Udaijin
 Naidaijin
 Dainagon

Eras of Go-Kōmyō's reign
The years of Go-Kōmyō's reign are more specifically identified by more than one era name or nengō.

 Kan'ei            (1624–1644)
 Shōhō             (1644–1648)
 Keian             (1648–1652)
 Jōō  (1652–1655)

Ancestry

Notes

References
 Meyer, Eva-Maria. (1999).  Japans Kaiserhof in der Edo-Zeit: unter besonderer Berücksichtigung der Jahre 1846 bis 1867.  Münster: LIT Verlag. ;   OCLC 42041594
 Ponsonby-Fane, Richard Arthur Brabazon. (1959).  The Imperial House of Japan. Kyoto: Ponsonby Memorial Society. OCLC 194887
 Titsingh, Isaac. (1834). Nihon Ōdai Ichiran; ou,  Annales des empereurs du Japon.  Paris: Royal Asiatic Society, Oriental Translation Fund of Great Britain and Ireland.  OCLC 5850691
 Varley, H. Paul. (1980). Jinnō Shōtōki: A Chronicle of Gods and Sovereigns. New York: Columbia University Press. ;  OCLC 59145842

See also
 Imperial cult

Japanese emperors
Go-Komyo of Japan, Emperor
Go-Komyo of Japan, Emperor
Emperor Go-Komyo
Emperor Go-Komyo
Emperor Go-Komyo
Deaths from smallpox
Infectious disease deaths in Japan
17th-century Japanese monarchs